Jean-Baptiste François Soleil (1798–1878) was a French optician and engineer.

Biography 
In 1819, Soleil founded an eponymous company at 23 Passage Vivienne in Paris, specialised in making optics instruments for such notable researchers as Fresnel, Arago, Foucault and Babinet. In 1825 he moved business to 21, rue de l'Odéon . In 1843, he made a heliostat for  Jean Thiébault Silbermann. In 1849, the business was split between to divisions under his son Henri Soleil, and his son-in-law Jules Duboscq. The Soleil division went on under Laurent Soleil, and has now been renamed to Jobin Yvon. The Duboscq division was renamed to Duboscq Pellin in 1883, and puis Pellin in 1886. In 1852, the Soleil workshop was purchased by Louis Sautter, maker of  Fresnel lesnes for lighthouses, who founded Sautter et Cie, later Sautter-Lemonnier et Cie, and eventually Sautter-Harlé.

References 

1798 births
1878 deaths
French engineers